Hussein Faisal Hussein Abdelkader (born 4 March 1999) is an Egyptian professional footballer who plays as an attacking midfielder for Egyptian League club Smouha

Career statistics

Club

International

References

External links
 

1999 births
Living people
Egyptian footballers
Egypt youth international footballers
Association football forwards
Zamalek SC players
Egyptian Premier League players